The Eastern South Dakota Conference is a high school athletic conference made up of nine teams of Class AA in the East River Region of South Dakota. All schools are members of the SDHSAA. Sports offered are boys & girls basketball, football, boys & girls track & field, boys and girls cross country, volleyball, wrestling, competitive dance & cheer, and, starting in 2012, boys & girls soccer.

Current members

Former members

Conference history

The Eastern South Dakota Conference consists of eight of the Class AA teams in the East River Region of South Dakota. The conference  was established in 1927 and went through many changes as schools only wanted to participate in certain sports. In 1994 Sioux Falls Lincoln, Roosevelt, Washington and O'Gorman were forced to leave the Sioux Interstate Conference with Sioux City, Iowa schools due to the non traditional girls sports seasons. The four schools applied for ESD membership but were denied due to the conference not wanting to expand beyond eight teams, in 1996 The Sioux Falls Schools approached Independent West River Schools Rapid City Central, Rapid City Stevens, Spearfish and Sturgis Brown to form a conference. After several attempts, the Greater Dakota Conference was formed. In the late 2000s West River schools have pushed to join the ESD Conference only to be denied membership, the 2012-2013 school year the Greater Dakota Conference will cease as a new Conference named the Metro Conference will be formed consisting of Sioux Falls Washington, Lincoln, Roosevelt, O'Gorman and Brandon Valley, thereby leaving Rapid City Stevens, Rapid City  Central and Sturgis out of a conference. (Spearfish left the GDC for the Black Hills Conference in 2011 due to dropping to Class A.) The Metro Conference was formed due to travel concerns as the distance between Sioux Falls and Rapid City is 396 miles. Brandon Valley and Harrisburg will be in a dual membership with the Metro and ESD Conferences. In 2015 Rapid City Stevens and Central both got into the ESD, only for football. In the 2021-2022 season, the football conferences were realigned and Aberdeen Central and Watertown dropped down to 11AA, leaving Brandon, Harrisburg, Stevens, Rapid City Central and the Sioux Falls schools in 11AAA. In football that leaves Aberdeen Central, Brookings, Huron, Mitchell, Pierre, Watertown, and Yankton in 11AA with a couple of other teams. Due to the massive growth to the Sioux Falls area and it’s schools, there is concern that Brandon and Harrisburg might just become too big for the ESD. In 2023 it was announced that Tea Area will join the ESD in the 2024-25 season, which will move them up to Class AA in all sports.

References

http://local.brookings.k12.sd.us/activities/esdhistory.pdf

1927 establishments in South Dakota
High school sports conferences and leagues in the United States